The 2007 Winter Deaflympics, officially known as the 16th Winter Deaflympics, is an international multi-sport event that was held from 3 to 10 February 2007 in Salt Lake City, United States.

Sports
Curling has been recognized as a demonstration sports.

 
 
 Skiing

Results
https://www.deaflympics.com/games/2007-w/results

Medals

Nations
Countries participated:

Country	/ Men / Women	/ Total

 	1	0	1
 	8	1	9
 	28	7	35
 	11	3	14
 	0	6	6
    0	4	4
 	25	1	26
    1	0	1
 	19	2	21
 	5	5	10
 	12	5	17
    1	0	1
 	0	1	1
 	1	0	1
 	1	1	2
 	29	5	34
 	4	7	11
 	1	1	2
    25	0	25
    10	3	13
    4	0	4
    5	3	8
    39	13	52

Total   230	68 298

See also
2002 Winter Olympics
2002 Winter Paralympics

External links
 https://web.archive.org/web/20170814062349/http://deaflympics.com/games.asp?2007-w
Results book

References 

 
2007 Winter
February 2007 sports events in the United States
2000s in Salt Lake City
2007 in sports in Utah